Jordan McCray (born May 31, 1992) is an American football center for the San Antonio Brahmas of the XFL. He played college football at the University of Central Florida and was signed by the Green Bay Packers as an undrafted free agent in 2014.

Professional career

Green Bay Packers
After going undrafted in the 2014 NFL Draft, McCray signed with the Green Bay Packers on May 12, 2014. On August 30, 2014, he was released by the Packers during final team cuts.

Minnesota Vikings
McCray ended up signing with the Minnesota Vikings on December 17, 2014. Sometime later McCray was released.

Carolina Panthers
On May 11, 2015, McCray was signed by the Carolina Panthers. On September 5, 2015, he was released by the Panthers.

Arena Football League
McCray then joined the Arena Football League with the Orlando Predators, where McCray played with his twin Justin. On October 14, 2016, McCray was assigned to the Cleveland Gladiators during the dispersal draft. On March 22, 2018 he was placed on League Suspension, and on March 24, 2018 he was activated for the Baltimore Brigade.

Orlando Apollos
In 2018, McCray signed with the Orlando Apollos for the 2019 AAF season. But his season was cut short due to the AAF operations being suspended.

Chicago Bears 
On June 13, 2019, McCray was signed by the Chicago Bears.

Tampa Bay Vipers
In October 2019, McCray was drafted by the Tampa Bay Vipers in the 2020 XFL Draft. He had his contract terminated when the league suspended operations on April 10, 2020.

Massachusetts Pirates
In 2021, McCray signed with the Massachusetts Pirates.

Birmingham Stallions
McCray was selected in the 20th round of the 2022 USFL Draft by the Birmingham Stallions.

San Antonio Brahmas
The San Antonio Brahmas selected McCray in the seventh round of the 2023 XFL Supplemental Draft on January 1, 2023. He was placed on the reserve list by the team on February 15, 2023.

References

1992 births
Living people
American football centers
UCF Knights football players
Players of American football from Miami
Green Bay Packers players
Minnesota Vikings players
Carolina Panthers players
Orlando Predators players
Cleveland Gladiators players
Baltimore Brigade players
Chicago Bears players
Orlando Apollos players
Tampa Bay Vipers players
Massachusetts Pirates players
Birmingham Stallions (2022) players
Sportspeople from Miami
San Antonio Brahmas players